The 6th convocation of the Sukhumi City Council has been in office since 13 April 2016.

Formation

2016 City Council election
The 2011 City Council election was contested by 82 candidates in 26 single-seat constituencies. Among the candidates were 14 sitting members of the City Council, including incumbent Chairman Konstantin Pilia. Of these, 5 were re-elected, including Pilia. One of the 18 female candidates was elected.

Reruns in constituencies no. 21 and no. 23
The elections in constituencies no. 21 and no. 23 had to be repeated as turnout had been below 25%. The rerun elections on 29 May were won by Temur Arshba and Said Adleiba, respectively, who had also participated originally.

Composition

Leadership
On 13 April, Konstantin Pilia was re-elected as chairman during the council's first session, defeating newly elected member Daur Eshba in a secret ballot. Eshba received thirteen votes in favour, one short of the fourteen required, eight against and three abstentions. Pilia then received seventeen votes, with five against and two abstentions. Mizan Zantaria was subsequently elected Deputy Chairman with one abstention.

During the Assembly's first and second sessions (the latter held on 19 April), commissions were formed and their leaders elected: Inna Kvarchia headed Education, Adamyr Lagvilava Housing and Communal Services, David Mirzoyan Health, Vitali Chitanava Physical Culture and Sport, Jon Smyr Veteran Affairs and Public Order, Daur Eshba Social Policy, Bagrat Zantaria Economy and Forecasting, Denis Inapshba Architecture and Construction, Georgi Shakaia Culture, Ardashes Ovsepyan Youth Policy and Lasha Ashuba Budget.

List of members

References

 
2016 establishments in Abkhazia